Daniel Wiffen (born 14 July 2001) is an Irish swimmer. who represents Ireland at Olympic, World and European level, and Northern Ireland at the Commonwealth Games In the 2022 Commonwealth Games he won the silver medal in the 1500 metre freestyle.

He competed in the men's 800 metre freestyle and 1500 metre freestyle at the 2020 Summer Olympics. In December 2022, he broke the European record for the 800 metres freestyle, becoming the first Irishman to hold a recognised European record in swimming. His swim was also  the fourth fastest in history.

References

External links
 

2001 births
Living people
Irish male swimmers
Irish male freestyle swimmers
Olympic swimmers of Ireland
Swimmers at the 2020 Summer Olympics
Place of birth missing (living people)
21st-century Irish people
Swimmers at the 2022 Commonwealth Games
Commonwealth Games medallists in swimming
Commonwealth Games silver medallists for Northern Ireland
Medallists at the 2022 Commonwealth Games